Exaerete azteca  is a species of euglossine bees.

Description
Exaerete azteca is primarily a bright blue in color, sometimes with purple reflections on its thorax and legs, and a weak golden on head

Distribution
This species is native to Mexico.

References

azteca
Hymenoptera of North America
Insects of Mexico
Insects described in 1964
Orchid pollinators